The High Commissioner of Malaysia to Canada is the head of Malaysia's diplomatic mission to Canada. The position has the rank and status of an Ambassador Extraordinary and Plenipotentiary and is based in the High Commission of Malaysia, Ottawa.

List of heads of mission

Chargé d'Affaires to Canada

High Commissioners to Canada

See also
 Canada–Malaysia relations

References 

 
Canada
Malaysia